Graeme F Hall (born 1946) is a retired rower who competed for Great Britain.

Rowing career
Hall rowed for Wallingford Rowing Club in 1967 before going to Cambridge University and rowing stroke for the winning Goldie crew (Cambridge reserve boat) at The Boat Race 1967. The following year he rowed stroke when representing the Downing College Boat Club in The Boat Race 1968 and won with the Cambridge crew stopping Oxford from winning a fourth consecutive race. Hall then won the main race for a second time the following year when Cambridge beat Oxford in The Boat Race 1969.

He became a British champion in 1972 when winning the eights at the 1972 British Rowing Championships. he participated in the 1974 World Rowing Championships in Lucerne, competing in the lightweight coxless four event. The crew selected from the Leander Club finished in seventh place overall after winning the B final.

In 1975 as part of the lightweight four with Nicholas Tee, Christopher Drury and Daniel Topolski they won a silver medal for Great Britain at the 1975 World Rowing Championships in Nottingham. The following year he was part of the lightweight eight that secured a silver medal at the 1976 World Rowing Championships in Villach, Austria.

References

1946 births
Living people
British male rowers
World Rowing Championships medalists for Great Britain